Outer Sister Island, part of the Sister Islands Conservation Area, is a granite and dolerite island, with an area of , located in Bass Strait, Tasmania, Australia.

Location and features
The Outer Sister Island is located north of Flinders Island in the Furneaux Group.  The island is grazed by sheep and annual muttonbirding takes place.

Seabirds and waders recorded as breeding on the island include little penguin, short-tailed shearwater, silver gull, Pacific gull and sooty oystercatcher.  Resident reptiles are the metallic skink, White's skink, white-lipped snake, lowland copperhead and tiger snake.  Apart from the sheep, mammals present on the island include the Tasmanian pademelon and the introduced house mouse, as well as feral cats.

See also

 List of islands of Tasmania
 Inner Sister Island
 Shag Reef

References

Furneaux Group